The  is a 30 km stream in Brandenburg and Berlin, and is named after the Tegel district of Berlin through which it flows.

The river's source is in Basdorf in Wandlitz and it flows down into Lake Tegel.

The Kindelfließ is a tributary of it.

External links

Rivers of Berlin
Rivers of Brandenburg
Rivers of Germany